Nicholas Sulentic (born 24 November 1887 in Croatia) immigrated from Croatia (then part of the former Austro-Hungarian Empire) to the United States in 1906, at age 15, living in Illinois and Wyoming before coming to Waterloo in 1916 to enter the grocery store business with his brother. Their business was located at the intersection of East Fourth and Adams Streets in a two-story brick building. He became president of North Waterloo Meat Co. and operated Pinkerton's grocery and bakery, the city's first supermarket, in 1921. He established a small factory on East Fourth Street but found the design of the valve spring compressor he had purchased was already protected by a patent. So, he invented his own device, a valve spring lifter, and combined it with a compressor. This device enabled garage mechanics to more easily gain access to parts within an engine. He founded Waterloo Valve Spring Compressor Co. in 1922. The company prospered and diversified from making tools to tool chests. The company was renamed Waterloo Industries in 1967 and became a successful tool storage manufacturer, with retail and industrial customers such as Sears (Craftsman brand), Lowe's, and Cornwell.

During the early 1930s, Sulentic was also president of Holt Products Co., a manufacturer of oat hullers. He was active in the political movement for an independent Croatia. Following World War II, Sulentic helped many refugees and displaced persons emigrate to the United States

References

1887 births
Year of death missing
American people of Croatian descent
Austro-Hungarian emigrants to the United States